Guilherme Weisheimer (born October 22, 1981 in Porto Alegre) was a former Brazilian striker.

He began playing football for Gremio youth team from the age of 10. He played for first time to Gremio's senior team in 2000–01, playing at the same team with Ronaldinho. He played 34 games with Gremio, in championship and Cup, and scored 8 goals until December 2002.
In January 2003 he was loan transferred to Criciúma Esporte Clube for 6 months. He returned in the summer of 2003 to his team Gremio, to be again loan transferred to Ulbra (3rd Division team) until December 2003.

In January 2005, he returned to his country to play for the teams Caxias and Veranopolis. One year later, in January 2006 he signed for the Greek club Aris Salonica, to be transferred twelve months later for AC Omonia.

References

External links

1981 births
Brazilian footballers
Brazilian expatriate footballers
AC Omonia players
Aris Thessaloniki F.C. players
Ethnikos Achna FC players
Atromitos Yeroskipou players
APOP Kinyras FC players
Ermis Aradippou FC players
Grêmio Foot-Ball Porto Alegrense players
Criciúma Esporte Clube players
Ahva Arraba F.C. players
Maccabi Herzliya F.C. players
Esporte Clube São José players
Clube Esportivo Bento Gonçalves players
Panelefsiniakos F.C. players
Super League Greece players
Cypriot First Division players
Liga Leumit players
Expatriate footballers in Sweden
Expatriate footballers in Israel
Expatriate footballers in Greece
Expatriate footballers in Cyprus
Brazilian expatriate sportspeople in Sweden
Brazilian expatriate sportspeople in Israel
Brazilian expatriate sportspeople in Greece
Brazilian expatriate sportspeople in Cyprus
Living people
Footballers from Porto Alegre
Brazilian people of German descent
Association football forwards